Claude Panier (13 December 1912 – 20 February 1990) was a French politician.

Panier was born in Luxeuil-les-Bains. He represented the Radical Party in the National Assembly from 1956 to 1958.

References

1912 births
1990 deaths
People from Luxeuil-les-Bains
Politicians from Bourgogne-Franche-Comté
Radical Party (France) politicians
Deputies of the 3rd National Assembly of the French Fourth Republic
French military personnel of World War II